Villa Garzón Airport  is an airport serving Villa Garzón, a town in the Putumayo Department of Colombia, also serving the town of Mocoa.

Airlines and Destinations

See also

Transport in Colombia
List of airports in Colombia

References

External links
OpenStreetMap - Villa Garzón Airport
OurAirports - Villa Garzón
FallingRain - Villa Garzón Airport

Airports in Colombia
Buildings and structures in Putumayo Department